The following article presents a summary of the 2000–01 football (soccer) season in Croatia, which was the 10th season of competitive football in the country.

League tables

Prva HNL

Championship group

Relegation group

Druga HNL

References